In both stock trading and financial technical analysis, an island reversal is a candlestick pattern with compact trading activity within a range of prices, separated from the move preceding it. A "candlestick pattern" is a movement in prices shown graphically on a candlestick chart. This separation shown on the chart, is said to be caused by an exhaustion gap and the subsequent move in the opposite direction occurs as a result of a breakaway gap.

Formation 
Close scrutiny of island reversal formations shows that the island reversal consists of an exhaustion gap and the subsequent move is followed by a breakaway gap. Uncommonly, the breakaway gap that completes the island is filled in a few days by a pull back as a result of the reaction. The island reversal can occur also, inversely, at the peak or the reverse of head and shoulders formations.reseversals

For example, assume that the price in a rising trend closes at its high of $84.00 and opens at $86.00 the following day and then does not fall below its opening. At the end of the day, it moves up further and touches $88.00, but closes at $87.60. Observation thus shows a gap of $2.00 which is not filled. On the following day, the market price opened at $87.40, touched a high of $88.90, and closed at $87.00. A few days later, or the very next day, the market price opens at $84.00 and closes at $82.90, keeping itself below the area of $86.00 and $84.00. All the trading above $86.00 will appear on the technical analysis chart to be isolated and is known as an "island reversal."

An example of a bearish island reversal pattern was identified by Kenneth Gruneisen and published via CANSLIM.net when ITT Educational Services (ESI) topped in January 2009. ESI fell from $120 to $12 in the 4 years that followed.

Characteristics 

 The occurrence of an island reversal is rather rare.
 It consists of a minor move.
 It is not, in itself, of major significance.
 It can occur at the top as well as at the bottom.
 The gaps at either end occur at almost the same price level.
 It has compact trading activity that is separated from the subsequent move, which is in the opposite direction.
 It is an extremely good indicator of a reversal of a primary or intermediate trend.
 As soon as it appears, it indicates that an extreme change in sentiment has occurred.
 High volume is expected in that compact trading area.
 The trading activity may last for only a single day or a couple of days. When this arrangement occurs for only a single day, it is known as "one-day reversal".

References

Chart patterns